Tanmoy Bose (born 23 August 1963), whose name is often preceded by the title Pandit (Master), is an India percussionist and tabla player, musical producer, film actor and composer. He has collaborated with Pandit Ravi Shankar, Anoushka Shankar and Amjad Ali Khan, and created the musical group The Taal Tantra Experience in 2002.

Early life and training
Tanmoy Bose was born and raised in Kolkata, and studied at the South Point High School and subsequently graduated from the Scottish Church College. His musical education began at the age of seven, learning vocal music from Pandit (teacher) Maharaj Banerjee, harmonium from Pandit Mantu Banerjee, and subsequently learning tabla.

His training in the traditional Guru Shishya Parampara started with Pandit Kanai Dutta, after whose death Tanmoy became a ganda bandh shagird (disciple) of Pandit Shankar Ghosh.

Career
Tanmoy Bose is a leading classical musician in the global fraternity of percussion. He received his early tutelage from the legendary Pt Kanai Dutta. Bose became the Gandabandh Shagird {formally initiated disciple in Indian classical music} under Pandit Shankar Ghosh. Over the last few years, through his associations with Pandit Ravi Shankar and Amjad Ali Khan, his brainchild, TaalTantra has emerged as one of the foremost world music bands regularly enthralling audiences in the Mid-East, North America, Europe and India experimenting with timeless Jazz, Indian Classical Music, Folk Music and indigenous drumming. The name signifies “sadhana” or worship through rhythm. 

Bose has also been a researcher and composer. He has created DHWANI, BEYOND BORDERS, TAALYAAGNA, CHATURANG and MOKSH - based on the virtues of Indian Rhythmic nuances. He has also been a  television presenter. He has couple of shows to his credits where he interacts with well-known Musicians, Film directors, Actors and Dancers. His Drumz Dreamz project & Hridmajhare are getting popular where it replays the concept of community drumming and indigenous music respectively.

He has a number of award winning films and music projects to his credit.

Discography

Awards and accolades

Sangeet SAMMAN, Govt of West Bengal 2013
Centre for Indian Studies, USA
 Bengali Association of Greater Nashville, USA
 Indo-American Cultural and Religious Foundation
 Shree Venkateswara Temple of North Carolina, USA
 Hafiz Ali Khan Memorial Society, Delhi
 North Calcutta Junior Chamber
 Salt Lake Cultural Association, Kolkata
 Sangeet Piyasi, Kolkata
 Alfa Bangla Sangeet Puraoshkar
 Shilpan Academy yearly Sangeet Sammelan
 Anti terrorism Cultural Protest of SPANDAN
 ITC Sangeet Sammelan, Munger
 South Point Golden Jubilee
 Punascha – ST.Louis, USA
 Shilpa Society
 Jagari— Kolkata
 UNICEF
 Bhalobasi Tai Gai
 Manjil
 Dalhousie Athletics Club, Kolkata
 South Point Ex-Student Association
 Music World, Kolkata
 Annual Sports Meet- Kolkata police

References

External links
 Tanmoy Bose, Profile at last.fm
 

Indian drummers
1951 births
Living people
Hindustani instrumentalists
Indian emigrants to the United States
Planet Drum members
Tabla players
Scottish Church College alumni
University of Calcutta alumni
National Heritage Fellowship winners
Musicians from Kolkata
Bengali musicians
Indian percussionists
American film people of Indian descent
American film score composers
American male musicians of Indian descent
American musicians of Indian descent
20th-century Indian musicians
American male film score composers
20th-century American male musicians